William Park Bell (April 19, 1886 – June 21, 1953) was a noted golf course architect, active from the 1920s into the early 1950s.

Biography
Born in Canonsburg, Pennsylvania, Billy Bell studied agriculture at Duff's Business Institute in Pittsburgh. He moved west to California at age 25 in 1911, and held a series of golf jobs at the Pasadena Country Club, including caddymaster and course superintendent. Bell worked on golf course construction for architect Willie Watson, including serving as Watson's superintendent, before going into golf course design and development on his own in 1920.

Most of Bell's courses were designed and built in southern California. He is considered one of the most important golf course architects in the state, with more than fifty courses credited to his work and design, and he designed and built courses in other western states as well, including Nevada, Arizona, Utah, Oregon, and Hawaii.

Early in his design career, Bell worked closely with famous designer and fellow Pennsylvanian George C. Thomas Jr., on courses which included the Riviera Country Club, often cited as one of the world's best courses. Although Thomas is listed as architect of record, Bell made significant contributions to many of the designs. Bell's son William F. Bell (1918–1984) trained with him, joined him in partnership after World War II, and later became an important golf course architect in his own right. Bell Sr. served as a turf consultant to the U.S. Army Corps of Engineers during the war, and was awarded a commendation by the Southern California chapter of the PGA, in honor of his work creating golf courses for wounded servicemen. Bell Sr. was a founding member of the American Society of Golf Course Architects, and served as ASGCA President in 1952.

Bell died in Pasadena at age 67 in 1953 and is buried at Mountain View Cemetery and Mausoleum in Altadena.

Courses
Golf courses designed and built by William P. Bell:

 Adobe Course at Arizona Biltmore Hotel (Resort), Phoenix, AZ
 Bakersfield Country Club (Private), Bakersfield, CA (with William F. Bell)
 Balboa Park Municipal Golf Club (Public), San Diego, CA
 Bel-Air Country Club (Private), Los Angeles, CA (with George C. Thomas Jr.)
 Brookside Golf Course (36) (Public), Pasadena, CA
 Chevy Chase Country Club (9) (Private), Glendale, CA (with William F. Bell)
 David L Baker Golf Club (Public), Fountain Valley, CA
 Encanto Park Golf Course (Public), Phoenix, AZ
 Forest Hills Golf Club (Public) Cornelius, OR (with William F. Bell)
 Girard Country Club (now Woodland Hills Country Club), (Private), Woodland Hills, CA.
 Hacienda Golf Club (Private) La Habra Heights, CA
 Kaneohe Klipper Golf Course (Military) Kaneohe, HI
 La Jolla Country Club (Private) La Jolla, CA
 Meadowlark Golf Club (Public) Huntington Beach, CA
 Mesa Verde Country Club (Private), Costa Mesa, CA
 Mesa Country Club (Private), Mesa, AZ
 Rancho Park Golf Course (Public), Los Angeles, CA
 Red Hill Country Club (Private), Alta Loma, CA (with George C. Thomas Jr.)
 San Diego Country Club (Private) San Diego, CA
 Stanford University Golf Club, (Private), Palo Alto, CA (with George C. Thomas Jr.)
 Sunnyside Country Club (Private), Fresno, CA
 Torrey Pines Golf Course (Municipal) San Diego, CA
 Tijuana Country Club, (Public), Tijuana, Mexico
 Tilden Park Golf Course (Public), Berkeley, CA
 Valley Country Club (Private), Englewood, CO
 Virginia Country Club, (Private), Long Beach, CA (with A.W. Tillinghast)
 Tucson Country Club (Private), Tucson, AZ (with William F. Bell)

Source:

References

Mesa Verde Country Club is in Costa Mesa Ca. Not Mesa Arizona

External links
William Bell Society - Bell legacy

1886 births
1953 deaths
People from Canonsburg, Pennsylvania
Sportspeople from Los Angeles
Golf course architects
Architects from Pasadena, California